Xuexi Qiangguo is a Chinese app primarily designed to teach Xi Jinping Thought. It is designed by Alibaba Group. As of October 2019, it has more than 100 million active users and is now claimed to be the most downloaded item on Apple's domestic App Store, surpassing social media apps such as WeChat and TikTok (also known as Douyin in Mandarin.)

The name of the app is a pun on Chinese Communist Party general secretary Xi Jinping's name. Xuéxí can mean "learning" or "learn from Xi."

Features 
Aside from offering ideological courses, it allows video chat with friends, sending messages that get deleted after being read, creating a personal calendar, getting informed through the state media or watching TV series about the history of the Chinese Communist Party. The app also has a section about Xi Jinping's thoughts and life and weekly quizzes can be taken about Xi's life and the CCP where points can be won. The usage of each of these sections can provide the user with "study points". By April 2019 it had more than 100 million active users according to Chinese state media.

Once the app is downloaded, it gains access to the ID card number, real name, "bio-data" gleaned from the annual health check, shopping history, phone number, location data and deleted content. Cure53 and the Open Technology Fund reported that the app allows Chinese government access to all of the data on Android-based phones.

The app is strongly promoted by the government institutions and party members get encouraged to download the app in order to "make the country strong". The app is also getting included in some university programs. Schools urge its students to learn from the app, employers give out certificates for "star learners", and some even require their employees to post a daily screenshot with their score at the app. People have complained about being pressured to use the app, with students and workers reporting anonymously that teachers and bosses publicly shame or threaten to punish those who have low scores or use the app infrequently. By 2021, the app was being used for romance scams.

See also 
 Xi Jinping Thought
 Core Socialist Values
 Chinese Dream
 General Secretary Xi Jinping important speech series
Xi Jinping's cult of personality
 Quotations from Chairman Mao Zedong

References 

Xi Jinping Thought
Xi Jinping
Mobile applications
Propaganda in China
Alibaba Group